Baye-Baye is a Filipino dish made from grated young coconut mixed with either newly harvested rice (pinipig) or corn and shaped into patties. It is a specialty of Pavia, Iloilo.

See also

References

Philippine rice dishes
Culture of Iloilo
Philippine desserts
Foods containing coconut
Visayan cuisine